The 1946–47 Polska Liga Hokejowa season was the 12th season of the Polska Liga Hokejowa, the top level of ice hockey in Poland. Four teams participated in the final round, and KS Cracovia won the championship.

Semifinal
 KS Pomorzanin Toruń - Lech Posen 2:2/0:1

Final Tournament

Final 
 KS Cracovia - Wisła Kraków 4:3

External links
 Season on hockeyarchives.info

Polska
Polska Hokej Liga seasons
1946–47 in Polish ice hockey